The Maiden Paps are twin hills near Hawick, in the Scottish Borders of the south east of Scotland, that have the shape of human breasts.

Although there are some well defined hills like the Maiden Paps, the Roxburgh Hills are gently rolling for the most part, like much of the Southern Uplands. Due to the surrounding landscape, hills such as the Maiden Paps tend to look more prominent than they actually are.

The Maiden Paps are relatively close to Shankend ( to the NE) and to the Hermitage Castle ( to the south); these are two places with a sinister reputation.

See also
 Paps of Anu
 Pap of Glencoe  
 Paps of Jura
 Breast-shaped hill

References

External links

Scottish Borders Walking Festival
Parish of Cavers

Mountains and hills of the Scottish Borders